Malik Shahzad Ahmed Khan (born 15 March 1962) has been Justice of the Lahore High Court since 12 May 2011. He served as the Acting Chief Justice of the Lahore High Court.

References

1962 births
Living people
Judges of the Lahore High Court
Pakistani judges